Prisca Liberali is an Italian chemist who is a senior group leader at the Friedrich Miescher Institute for Biomedical Research. Her research takes a systems biology approach to understand the behaviour of multi-cellular systems. She was awarded the European Molecular Biology Organization gold medal in 2022.

Early life and education 
Liberali was born in Belgium, and grew up between Belgium and Luxembourg. Her parents worked for the European Union. She attended the Sapienza University of Rome, where she studied physical organic chemistry. She moved to the Mario Negri Institute for Pharmacological Research, where she worked toward a doctorate in cell biology with Daniela Corda. Her doctorate looked at the mechanisms that regulate the function of the carboxy-terminal binding protein 3/brefeldin A-ribosylated substrate (CtBP3/BARS) in the membrane fission of mammal cells. Her PhD involved high-contrast screening and mapping of genetics interactions. Liberali then worked as a postdoctoral fellow in the Institute of Molecular Systems Biology at ETH Zurich.

Research and career 
In 2015, Liberali was made an assistant professor at the University of Basel. She was simultaneously appointed a group leader at the Friedrich Miescher Institute for Biomedical Research, where she was made Senior Group Leader in 2021.

Liberali makes use of a systems biology approach to understand tissue organisation. She is interested in the collective properties of multi-cellular systems and how their properties arise from the behaviour of individual cells. With this information, Liberali looks to understand cell reprogramming and disease. Her early work considered intestinal organoids and how they develop from stem cells.

In June 2022, Liberali was awarded the European Molecular Biology Organization gold medal. She was elected to the European Molecular Biology Organization in 2022.

Awards and honours 
 2003 Italian Association for Cancer Research Fellowship
 2015 Swiss National Science Foundation Professorship
 2017 European Research Council Starting Grant (SymBreakOragnoid)
 2019 EMBO Young Investigator
 2022 Friedrich Miescher Award
 2022 EMBO Gold Medal

Selected publications

Personal life 
Liberali is married with two children. Her husband is Dutch and her children can speak five languages. She has said that her guiding advice for someone about to start their own laboratory is "Sometimes good ideas need time, and the courage to just try them.".

References 

Italian women chemists
Living people
Year of birth missing (living people)
Sapienza University of Rome alumni
20th-century Italian chemists
Academic staff of the University of Basel